Victor Newman may refer to:

 Victor Newman (politician), Ghanaian politician and research analyst
 Victor Newman (fictional character) from the American CBS soap opera The Young and the Restless
Vic Newman Jr., from the American CBS soap opera The Young and the Restless

See also
Victor Neumann, Romanian historian